Edlyn may refer to:

Richard Edlyn
Edlyn Lewis